Col des Saisies (el. 1657 m.) is a mountain pass in the Alps in the department of Savoie in France.

The pass is delimited by the peak of  Bisanne to the west, and by the peaks of  Légette (Lézette) and Chard du Beurre to the east. The ski resort of Les Saisies is situated on the pass.

Appearances in Tour de France
The pass is often used as part of the route in the Tour de France, most recently in 2021.

References

See also
 List of highest paved roads in Europe
 List of mountain passes

Mountain passes of Auvergne-Rhône-Alpes
Mountain passes of the Alps